Kandoeng Commune is a khum (commune) in Bati District, Takéo Province, Cambodia.

Administration 
In 2019, Kandoeng Commune had eight phums (villages) as follows.

References 

Communes of Takéo province
Bati District